Staff Weather Officers (SWOs) are United States Air Force personnel tasked with providing tactical meteorological support for conventional Army forces.

The title is held by both officer and enlisted personnel tasked with this duty. Previous and alternate names for this career field are: Battlefield Weather, Combat Weather, Army Support Weather. The scope of support is extremely broad, from mission intelligence to special operations. SWOs are not the same as Special Operations Weather Team (SOWT) members.

Training
SWOs are required to first complete training requirements for all Air Force Weather personnel before attending trainings specific to SWOs.

Officers
Officers are degreed Meteorologists and must meet the World Meteorological Organization (WMO) basic instruction requirements before entrance into the career field is allowed. After commissioning into the United States Air Force, officers must attend Officer Training School (OTS) at Maxwell AFB, Alabama (Unless ROTC/Air Force Academy cadet program was completed). Following OTS Officers will then attend Weather Officers Course at Keesler AFB, Mississippi.

Enlisted
Enlisted personnel are not required to have a degree, and must only meet specific aptitude test requirements to enter the career field. After enlistment, all members must attend Basic Military Training (BMT) at Lackland AFB, Texas. After BMT, an eight month initial weather skills course is attended at Keesler AFB, Mississippi. Finally, a year of on the job training must be completed before fully qualified.

Staff Weather Officer
After completion of the above trainings, weather personnel attached to Army units must then complete additional trainings.

Army Weather Support Course (AWSC)
The AWSC at Fort Huachuca, Arizona is meant to better integrate the Air Force personnel into Army units. Here they will learn about the Army’s history, rank structure, organizational structure, and how weather is used in decision making processes. In addition to this course work, combat, land navigation, and other pertinent battlefield skills are taught here.

Evasion and Conduct After Capture (ECAC)
The ECAC course is a training utilized to better prepare military personnel in the event they must evade, or are captured in combat zones.

Additional training
SWOs must complete additional position qualification and combat skills trainings at their respective units and must remain combat mission ready through annual trainings and exercises in order to remain qualified and deployable. Army schools such as Air Assault, Airborne, and Ranger schools are available for attendance, but usually optional.

References 

 https://www.airforce.com/careers/detail/weather-officer
 https://ams.confex.com/ams/pdfpapers/66483.pdf
 http://www.af.mil/News/Article-Display/Article/138605/airmen-attend-army-weather-course/
 http://www.jcs.mil/Portals/36/Documents/Doctrine/pubs/jp3_59.pdf

United States Air Force specialisms